Eduardo Pérez Gonsalves was a Spanish chess player, Spanish Team Chess Championship winner (1967).

Biography
From the begin of 1960s to the mid-1970s, Eduardo Pérez Gonsalves was one of Spain's leading chess players. He has won four medals at the Spanish Team Chess Championships with Barcelona chess clubs: gold (1967), silver (1975) and two bronze (1964, 1969).

Eduardo Pérez Gonsalves played for Spain in the Chess Olympiads:
 In 1964, at second reserve board in the 16th Chess Olympiad in Tel Aviv (+1, =6, -4),
 In 1966, at second reserve board in the 17th Chess Olympiad in Havana (+1, =2, -3).

Eduardo Pérez Gonsalves played for Spain in the European Team Chess Championship preliminaries:
 In 1961, at reserve board in the 2nd European Team Chess Championship preliminaries (+1, =1, -2),
 In 1965, at reserve board in the 3rd European Team Chess Championship preliminaries (+2, =0, -0),
 In 1970, at reserve board in the 4th European Team Chess Championship preliminaries (+1, =0, -0),
 In 1973, at sixth board in the 5th European Team Chess Championship preliminaries (+1, =1, -0).

Eduardo Pérez Gonsalves played for Spain in the European Team Chess Championships:
 In 1961, at ninth board in the 2nd European Team Chess Championship in Oberhausen (+1, =1, -4),
 In 1970, at ninth board in the 4th European Team Chess Championship in Kapfenberg (+0, =3, -3).

Eduardo Pérez Gonsalves played for Spain in the Clare Benedict Cup:
 In 1966, at reserve board in the 13th Clare Benedict Chess Cup in Brunnen (+0, =1, -0) and won team silver medal.

References

External links
 
 Eduardo Perez Gonsalves chess games at 365chess.com

Year of birth missing
Year of death missing
Spanish chess players
Chess Olympiad competitors